Monster is a 2018 American legal drama film directed by Anthony Mandler, from a screenplay by Radha Blank, Cole Wiley, and Janece Shaffer, based on the novel of the same name by Walter Dean Myers. It stars Kelvin Harrison Jr., Jennifer Ehle, Tim Blake Nelson, Nasir "Nas" Jones, Rakim "A$AP Rocky" Mayers, Paul Ben-Victor, John David Washington, Jennifer Hudson, and Jeffrey Wright. Wright, Jones, and John Legend also serve as executive producers on the film.

Three years after its world premiere at the Sundance Film Festival on January 22, 2018, the film was acquired by Netflix and released on May 7, 2021. It received generally positive reviews from critics.

Premise

Cast

Release
The film premiered in the U.S. Dramatic Competition section at the 2018 Sundance Film Festival. In April 2019, it was announced that Entertainment Studios had acquired distribution rights to the film, retitled All Rise. In November 2020, Netflix acquired distribution rights to the film, with the title switching back to Monster. It was released on their service on May 7, 2021.

Reception 
 The website's critical consensus reads, "Monster would have benefited from a less heavy-handed approach, but Kelvin Harrison Jr.'s performance gives this timely drama emotional heft." According to Metacritic, which assigned a weighted average score of 56 out of 100 based on 18 critics, the film received "mixed or average reviews".

See also
List of black films of the 2010s
List of hood films

References

External links
 

2018 films
2018 directorial debut films
2018 drama films
American drama films
Hood films
English-language Netflix original films
Films based on American novels
Films directed by Anthony Mandler
Courtroom films
2010s English-language films
2010s American films